Lawrence L. Bond (born June 11, 1951) is an American author and wargame designer. He is the designer of the Harpoon and Command at Sea gaming systems, and several supplements for the games. Examples of his numerous novels include Dangerous Ground, Day of Wrath, The Enemy Within, Cauldron, Vortex and Red Phoenix. He also co-authored Red Storm Rising with Tom Clancy.

Early life and education
Bond was born on June 11, 1951 and grew up outside St. Paul, Minnesota. When he was eight years old, an uncle gave him a copy of Afrika Korps, spurring his lifelong interest in wargames. In 1973, Bond graduated from St. Thomas College with a degree in quantitative methods, and worked as a computer programmer for two years before joining the U.S. Navy.

Career

U.S. Navy
Bond graduated from the United States Navy Officer Candidate School in Newport, Rhode Island in 1976. He spent six years on active naval duty, including four years on destroyers, followed by two years in the Naval Reserve Intelligence Program. After leaving the navy, he worked as a naval analyst for defense consulting firms in the Washington, D.C. area.

Harpoon gaming system

Bond's Harpoon gaming system was first published in 1980. Designed as a general-purpose air, surface, and submarine naval simulation, it combines playability with a wealth of information on modern naval weapons systems. Designed for the entry-level player, it has found acceptance in both the commercial market and the professional naval community. It is used at the Naval Academy, several ROTC installations, and on several surface ships as a training aid.

Now in its fourth edition, Harpoon won the H.G. Wells Award, a trade association honor, in both 1981 and 1987 as the best miniatures game of the year. The computer version of the game first appeared in 1989 and won the 1990 Wargame of the Year award from Computer Gaming World, an industry journal.

Literary career
Bond's began his writing career by collaborating with Tom Clancy on Red Storm Rising (1986), a New York Times bestseller that was one of the best-selling books of the 1980s. It depicted a hypothetical conflict between NATO and the Warsaw Pact, drawing heavily on current analysis of what such a conflict would be like. It has been used as a text at the Naval War College.

Since then, Bond's books have depicted military and political crises, emphasizing accuracy and fast-paced action. Red Phoenix, Vortex, and Cauldron were all New York Times bestsellers. Red Phoenix is set in South Korea and depicts an invasion of the south instigated by the North Korean government. Vortex tells the story of a reactionary Afrikaner government trying to roll back the clock in South Africa. Cauldron shows a financial crisis in Europe that grew out of control, leading to a military confrontation between France, Germany and countries of the Eastern Europe (Poland, Czech Republic, Hungary) supported by the United States.

Personal life
Bond makes his home in Springfield, Virginia. He and his wife Jeanne are the parents of two daughters.

Bibliography
Sources:

With Tom Clancy 
Red Storm Rising, 1986

 With Patrick Larkin Red Phoenix, 1989Vortex, 1991Cauldron, 1993The Enemy Within, 1996Day of Wrath, 1998

 With Chris Carlson Lash-Up, 2015Red Phoenix Burning, 2016

 Jerry Mitchell Series Dangerous Ground, 2005Cold Choices, 2009Exit Plan, 2012Shattered Trident, 2013Burial at Sea, 2013Fatal Thunder, 2016Arctic Gambit, 2018

 With Jim DeFelice 
 First Team Series Larry Bond's First Team, 2004Larry Bond's First Team: Angels of Wrath, 2006Larry Bond's First Team: Fires of War, 2006Larry Bond's First Team: Soul of the Assassin, 2008

 Red Dragon Rising Series Larry Bond's Red Dragon Rising: Shadows of War, 2009Larry Bond's Red Dragon Rising: Edge of War, 2010Larry Bond's Red Dragon Rising: Shock of War, 2012Larry Bond's Red Dragon Rising: Blood of War, 2013

 Edited by Larry Bond Crash Dive: True Stories of Submarine Combat'', 2010

References

1952 births
Techno-thriller writers
Board game designers
Living people
University of St. Thomas (Minnesota) alumni
20th-century American novelists
20th-century American male writers
21st-century American novelists
American male novelists
United States Navy officers
People from Springfield, Virginia
21st-century American male writers